Kishwer Falkner, Baroness Falkner of Margravine (born 9 March 1955) is a British politician and life peer who is a non-aligned member of the House of Lords. She was the Chairman of the EU Financial Affairs Sub-Committee in the House of Lords from 2015 to 2019.

Prior to her ennoblement as a life peer with the title Baroness Falkner of Margravine, of Barons Court in the London Borough of Hammersmith and Fulham on 2 June 2004, Falkner worked for the Liberal Democrats in the House of Commons and party headquarters including as Director of International Affairs and Director of Policy. She also worked at the Commonwealth Secretariat and as Chief Executive of Student Partnerships Worldwide. In February 2008 she was appointed as the inaugural chancellor of The University of Northampton.

She is currently a member of the Bank of England's Enforcement Decision Making Committee. She is also a Visiting Professor at The Policy Institute at King's College London and an honorary associate of the National Secular Society.

In December 2020, she became chair of the Equality and Human Rights Commission (EHRC). Her appointment led to criticism both from her predecessor and staff members who said EHRC had become politicised and transphobic during her tenure.

Life 
Kishwer Falkner was born in Pakistan and after living and working in the Middle East, moved to the UK in the late 1970s. Falkner was educated at convent schools in Pakistan, the London School of Economics where she obtained a BSc (Econ) in International Relations and the University of Kent where she obtained an MA in International Relations and European Studies.

Political career 
She joined the Liberal Democrats in the mid-1980s and worked for the party in several posts till 1999. Falkner contested Kensington and Chelsea in the 2001 General Election and was on the Liberal Democrats list for London in the 2004 European elections.

Kishwer was the Liberal Democrats’ Director of International and European Affairs for several years, co-authoring much of the Party's policy on the European Union, and coordinating a joint response for European Liberals on issues related to Europe's structures and place in the world.  Kishwer also worked for the Commonwealth Secretariat, where she continued to work on the broader issues of globalisation, democracy and development. In 2003–04, Kishwer was chief executive of a charity working with young people in some of the poorest parts of Africa and Asia.

EHRC head 
On 1 December 2020, she became chair of the Equality and Human Rights Commission (EHRC).

Transphobia controversy
Falkner and the EHRC under her leadership have come under criticism from trans and other LGBTIQ+ organisations following comments she made in May 2021 to The Times, in which she said that women had the right to question transgender identity without fear of abuse, stigmatisation or loss of employment. Her predecessor as EHRC chair, David Isaac, said the commission was politicised by the Conservative Party during her tenure. Several former and current staff members of EHRC described the public body as "transphobic," "anti-LGBT+" and an "enemy of human rights" during Falkner's tenure, and media reported that several staff members had resigned in protest of EHRC's "descent into transphobia." EHRC was also criticised for holding private meetings with anti-trans groups such as LGB Alliance and Fair Play For Women. Scottish National Party MP John Nicolson, deputy chair of the All-Party Parliamentary Group on Global LGBT+ Rights in the UK Parliament, said: "Sadly the EHRC appears now to be working against, not for, LGBT rights. Our community no longer see it as our friend but as our opponent. It's yet another organisation tainted by Boris Johnson and his appointees."

When asked in an interview with Holyrood if she was a transphobe, Falkner replied: "I don't know what the meaning of that word is." However, despite claiming not to know the meaning of the word, Falkner complained that the word was used "too much".

Electoral history

References 

Life peeresses created by Elizabeth II
Falkner of Margravine
Alumni of the London School of Economics
Alumni of the University of Kent
1955 births
Living people
Pakistani emigrants to the United Kingdom
British politicians of Pakistani descent
Liberal Democrats (UK) parliamentary candidates